General Conrad may refer to:

Casper H. Conrad Jr. (1872–1954), U.S. Army brigadier general
Gerhard Conrad (pilot) (1895–1982), German Luftwaffe lieutenant general
Michael J. Conrad (born 1933), U.S. Army major general

See also
Franz Conrad von Hötzendorf (1852−1925), Austro-Hungarian Army general
Rudolf Konrad (1891–1964), German Wehrmacht general